Coatomer subunit epsilon is a protein that in humans is encoded by the COPE gene.

Function 

The product of this gene is an epsilon subunit of coatomer protein complex. Coatomer is a cytosolic protein complex that binds to dilysine motifs and reversibly associates with Golgi non-clathrin-coated vesicles. It is required for budding from Golgi membranes, and is essential for the retrograde Golgi-to-ER transport of dilysine-tagged proteins. Coatomer complex consists of at least the alpha, beta, beta', gamma, delta, epsilon and zeta subunits. Alternatively spliced transcript variants encoding different isoforms have been identified.

Interactions 

COPE (gene) has been shown to interact with COPA.

References

External links

Further reading